In descriptive set theory, a set  is said to be homogeneously Suslin if it is the projection of a homogeneous tree.  is said to be -homogeneously Suslin if it is the projection of a -homogeneous tree.

This result is important in the proof that the existence of a measurable cardinal implies that  sets are determined.

See also
 Projective determinacy

References
 

Descriptive set theory
Determinacy